Leng Tsai is a village in Fanling, North District, Hong Kong.

Administration
Leng Tsai is a recognized village under the New Territories Small House Policy.

References

External links
 Delineation of area of existing village Leng Tsai (Fanling) for election of resident representative (2019 to 2022)

Villages in North District, Hong Kong
Fanling